George Washington Peck (June 4, 1818 – June 30, 1905) was a United States representative from the state of Michigan.

Biography 
Peck was born in New York City and pursued classical studies, attending Yale College and studying law in New York City.  He moved to Michigan in 1839 and settled in Brighton, where he was admitted to the bar in 1842 and commenced practice there in the same year.  He was a member of the Michigan State House of Representatives in 1846 and 1847 and served as speaker the last term.  He moved to Lansing, when the state capital was located there in 1847.  He was the first postmaster of Lansing and was Michigan Secretary of State from 1848 to 1849.  He was editor and proprietor of the Lansing Journal and the state printer 1852-1855. He was elected as a Democrat to the Thirty-fourth Congress, serving from March 4, 1855, to March 3, 1857, representing Michigan's 4th congressional district. He was unsuccessful in seeking reelection in 1856.

Peck was elected mayor of Lansing in 1867. He then moved to East Saginaw and engaged in the practice of law until 1873. He moved to St. Louis, Missouri, in 1873, and to Hot Springs, Arkansas, in 1880, and then to Bismarck, Missouri, in 1882.  He died in Saginaw, Michigan, and is interred in Brady Hill Cemetery there.

References

1818 births
1905 deaths
American Freemasons
Speakers of the Michigan House of Representatives
Mayors of Lansing, Michigan
Burials in Michigan
Secretaries of State of Michigan
Democratic Party members of the United States House of Representatives from Michigan
19th-century American politicians
People from Brighton, Michigan
Politicians from Saginaw, Michigan
Yale College alumni